Shimoga, officially known as Shivamogga, is a city and the district headquarters of Shimoga district in the central part of the state of Karnataka, India. The city lies on the banks of the Tunga River. Being the gateway for the hilly region of the Western Ghats, the city is popularly nicknamed the "Gateway of Malnad". The population of Shimoga city is 322,650 as per 2011 census. The city has been selected for the Smart Cities project, standing in the fourth position in the state and 25th in the country as of November 2020.

The city is 569 m above sea level and is surrounded by lush green paddy fields, arecanut and coconut groves. It is located 267 km from the state capital Bangalore and 195 km from the port city Mangalore.

History
The name of the city is derived from the term "shivmoga". A version of the etymology is the story that Shiva drank the Tunga River water using "Mogge", hence the name Shiva-mogga". Another version of the etymology is that the name is derived from the term "Sihi-Mogge", meaning "sweet pot".

The district formed the southern tip of the Emperor Ashoka's Mauryan Empire in the third century BC. It was ruled during later centuries by the Kadambas (4th century), Chalukyas (6th century), Western Ganga, Rashtrakutas (8th century), Hoysalas (11th century), and the Vijayanagara rulers (15th century). Nayakas of Keladi , also known as Nayakas of Bednore and Ikkeri Nayakas, were an Indian dynasty based in Keladi in present-day Shimoga district of Karnataka, India. They were an important ruling dynasty in late medieval and early modern Karnataka. They initially ruled as a vassal of the famous Vijayanagar Empire. After the fall of the empire in 1565, they gained independence and ruled significant parts of Malnad region of the Western Ghats in present-day Karnataka, most areas in the coastal regions of Karnataka, and parts of northern Kerala, Malabar and the central plains along the Tungabhadra river. In 1763 AD, with their defeat to Hyder Ali, they were absorbed into the Kingdom of Mysore.  

During the Satyagraha movement, Mahatma Gandhi also visited the place to instigate the fight for national freedom. After the independence of India in 1947, the Mysore state merged into the Republic of India.

On 1 November 2006, the government of Karnataka announced the renaming of Shimoga to "Shivamogga", along with nine other cities in the state. The central government approved (12 cities) the request in the October 2014 and the city was renamed on 1 November 2014.

Demographics
As of 2011 Indian Census, Shimoga had a total population of 322,650, of which 162,018 were males and 160,632 were females. Population within the age group of 0 to 6 years was 32,691. The total number of literates in Shimoga was 254,531, which constituted 78.9% of the population with male literacy of 81.4% and female literacy of 76.3%. The effective literacy rate of 7+ population of Shimoga was 87.8%, of which male literacy rate was 90.8% and female literacy rate was 84.8%. The Scheduled Castes and Scheduled Tribes population was 40,737 and 9,192 respectively. Shimoga had 76009 households in 2011.

Kannada is the most widely spoken language in Shimoga. 85.5% of people are Hindus and 12.25% are Muslims, with rest being Buddhists, Christians and other..

Geography
As per the Smart City Proposal, of the total city area (around 70.01 m²),  11.28% area is under OS & green belts while 7% is under water cover. Most/all these hills are part of the Western Ghats, a region known for plentiful rainfall and lush greenery and declared during 2012 as a World Heritage site. Tunga River flows through Shimoga. The river is the major source of drinking water in the city and the city gets its drinking water through the Tunga dam (also known as Gajanuru dam).

Climate 
The climate is tropical wet and dry (Köppen climate classification) summer average temperature . This means that the winter and the early part of summer are typically dry periods. The majority of the rainfall occurs between June and early October. Shimoga is a part of a region known as Malnad (land of hills) in Karnataka. Yearly, the rainfall aggregates up to 3295mm of precipitation. January and February are the driest months, July the wettest, and April is the warmest month with an average high temperature of 35.5 degrees Celsius (95.9 degrees F). Coldest months of Shimoga are July, August, November and December with average high temperature of 27 degrees Celsius (80.6 degrees F). In summer (April–May), temperature crosses 36 °C at Shimoga.

Civic administration 

Shimoga is governed by a Municipal Corporation called the Shivamogga City Corporation. Shimoga has been selected under the Smart Cities Mission of the Indian Government under Round 2 of selections. Shimoga was upgraded to a Municipal Corporation from a Municipal Council in 2013. The latest Mayoral elections of Shimoga City Corporation were held in January 2020 in which BJP leader Suvarna Shankar was elected the Mayor and Surekha Muralidhar was elected as the Deputy Mayor. Since they were elected by elected representatives belonging to their party, we can say that the corporation has direct elections. The corporation has a Council of 35 elected members. In 2018, Smt. Charulatha Somal took charge as the Municipal Commissioner of Shimoga City Corporation.

Economy 

APMC of Shimoga is main marketing point of arecanut, the major commercial crop grown in the district and well as in neighbouring districts like Uttara Kannada. Shimoga has the biggest areca nut market, and known for procuring high quality areca nuts. Other agricultural produces like rice, Maize, chili, coconut etc. are also marketed in APMC.
 
Shimoga IT Park is an information technology hub built just outside Shimoga near the upcoming Shimoga Airport. The IT Park consists of a 100000 sq ft office building with 24/7 electrical capacity, diesel backup generators, and high speed T1 data connections for use by IT industries such as data centres, call centres, aerospace, robotics, etc.

Education
Shimoga is one of the important centers for the high school and the pre-university education in Karnataka. Notable institutes in Shimoga for pre-university (PU) education include: Sri Aurobindo PU College and PACE PU College.

The village of Gajanur hosts a Jawahar Navodaya Vidyalaya (central school) which is a boarding school. Kuvempu University is located in Shankarghatta, at a distance of 20 km from Shimoga.

Shimoga Institute of Medical Sciences is the medical sciences college at Shimoga and managed by Government Departments. Subbaiah Institute of Medical Sciences is located at Purale. It also has two engineering colleges, Jawaharlal Nehru National College of Engineering and PES Institute of Technology and Management.

Transportation 

Shimoga is well connected by road to major cities like Bangalore, Mysore,Mangalore, Hubli, Davangere, bellary. Two major National Highways pass through the city.

The city has two railway stations, main one being Shivamogga Town Railway Station, and there are trains that run to and from Bangalore, Mysore, Tirupati and Chennai.

Shimoga Airport is situated near Sogane, 13  km south of Shimoga. This is the first airport which is being operated by Karnataka State Industrial & Infrastructure Development Corporation  Limited as a wholly owned and undertaking of Government of Karnataka and not handed over to Airport Authority of India. The nearest international airports are Kempegowda International Airport and Mangalore International Airport.

Notable people

 

U. R. Ananthamurthy, Jnanapeetha awardee
Sarekoppa Bangarappa, former Chief Minister of Karnataka
K. S. Eshwarappa, a politician and former Deputy Chief Minister of Karnataka
Mathur Krishnamurthy, Kannada language writer.
Kuvempu, a National poet, Jnanapeetha winner
P Lankesh
Kadidal Manjappa, 3rd Chief Minister of Karnataka
Shekhar Naik, a former captain of the Indian blind cricket team
D. H. Shankaramurthy, Former Chairman of the Karnataka Legislative Assembly
Khadi Shankarappa, a freedom fighter
Shimoga Subbanna, a playback singer
Sudeep, an actor and director in Indian cinema
Archana Udupa , Indian playback singer
B. S. Yediyurappa, 19th Chief Minister of Karnataka

See also
Alada Halli, Shimoga

References

External links

Shimoga Zilla Panchayat
Shimoga Profile
U.S. Army Corps of Engineers detailed map of Shimoga district 1959
Shimoga City Website

 
Articles containing potentially dated statements from 2007
All articles containing potentially dated statements
Cities and towns in Shimoga district
Cities in Karnataka